Hamilton's Pharmacopeia is an American docuseries, which premiered on Viceland on October 26, 2016. The show follows Hamilton Morris as he explores the history, chemistry and social impact of psychoactive substances. It chronicles Morris' travels and first-hand experiences, as well as interviews with scientists, shamans and fringe culture figures.

Background
Hamilton's Pharmacopeia is a documentary series created, written, and directed by Hamilton Morris. It has been produced in various forms since 2009. Hamilton's Pharmacopeia began as a monthly column about psychoactive drugs written by Morris for Vice magazine. When given the opportunity to film short documentaries to accompany his written pieces, Morris began to produce Hamilton's Pharmacopeia as an online documentary series starting with the release of The Sapo Diaries that same year. Initially the series was only available on VBS.TV, but after its release on YouTube the series began to gain a wider international following. From 2009 to 2017, Morris produced ten Pharmacopeia documentaries before the show began its first season on the cable television channel Viceland (now Vice TV). From 2016 to 2020, Morris directed twenty episodes of Hamilton's Pharmacopeia for Viceland. After delays caused by the COVID-19 pandemic, the third season was released on January 4, 2021.

Episodes

Series overview

Season 1 (2016)

Season 2 (2017–18)

Season 3 (2021)

Reception
The show has received widespread critical acclaim for its alternative and unusually honest approach to the portrayal of recreational drug use. Writing for The Guardian, Tim Jonze drew comparisons between Morris' obsessive dedication to his subject and similar qualities in his father. Praising his demeanor on the show, Jonze writes: "Morris is a good presence on screen – dressed all in white, he has a sort of charming awkwardness not dissimilar to Louis Theroux (they share the same disarming smile) and he allows his subjects plenty of space to tell their stories." In another review for The New York Times, Ross Simonini praised the show's unique tone: "Mr. Morris has a grinning, laid-back persona, with an approach not dissimilar to Hunter S. Thompson’s gonzo journalism. In person Mr. Morris, son of the filmmaker Errol Morris, is bookish and intense, speaking with a fastidious attention to word choice." Hermione Hoby made similar remarks, writing that Hamilton Morris proceeds with "a mix of gonzo abandon and scholarly rigour".

See also
List of programs broadcast by Viceland

References

Drug culture
Viceland original programming